Louis, Duke of Burgundy (1682–1712) was the eldest son of Le Grand Dauphin and grandson of Louis XIV.

Louis, Duke of Burgundy may also refer to:
Louis, Duke of Burgundy (1751–1761), eldest son of Louis, Dauphin of France and Princess Maria Joasepha of Saxony
Prince Louis, Duke of Burgundy (b. 2010), elder twin son of Louis Alphonse, Duke of Anjou